Jackie Ray "Jack" Buckalew (November 11, 1932 – March 3, 2016) was an American law enforcement officer and politician.

Buckalew was born in Charleston, West Virginia, and graduated from Ripley High School in 1950. He served in the United States Navy from 1951 to 1955 on the aircraft carrier USS Hornet (CV-12). He received a bachelor's degree in criminal justice from Morris Harvey College and master's degree in safety education from Marshall University. He served as superintendent of the West Virginia State Police and Charleston Police Chief. Buckalew served in the West Virginia State Senate and was a Republican. Buckalew lived in Ripley, West Virginia. He also served as secretary of the West Virginia Department of Administration. Buckalew died at his home in Boca Raton, Florida.

He was a Kentucky Colonel.

Notes

1932 births
2016 deaths
People using the U.S. civilian title colonel
Politicians from Charleston, West Virginia
People from Ripley, West Virginia
Marshall University alumni
Republican Party West Virginia state senators
American police chiefs
People from Boca Raton, Florida
Military personnel from Charleston, West Virginia
United States Navy sailors
Morris Harvey College alumni